Starfuckers was an Italian avant-garde experimental rock/art rock band, primarily from the 1990s. The band is considered a notable part of the Italian rock genre and one of the more "out there" bands during its active tenure. Starfuckers formed in 1987 and the band's first album of five came in 1989. It changed its name to Sinistri in 2000.

Discography
 1989 – Metallic Diseases
 1991 – Brodo Di Cagne Strategico
 1994 – Sinistri
 1997 – Infrantumi
 2002 – Infinitive Sessions

Components
 Manuele Giannini
 Gianni Ginesi
 Roberto Bertacchini
 Paolo Casini
 Gianfranco Verdaschi
 Alessandro Bocci

References

External links
 Official website
 Starfuckers Music on MySpace

Italian rock music groups
Drunken Fish Records artists
Italian experimental rock groups
Italian noise rock groups
Musical groups from Tuscany